Dato' Tan Lian Hoe (born 14 November 1958) is a Malaysian politician. She was a Member of Parliament of Malaysia from 2004 to 2013. She was a member of the Malaysian People's Movement Party (Gerakan), a former component party in the then-ruling Barisan Nasional (BN) coalition.

Political career
Tan was elected to the Gerik seat in the 2008 election, having served from 2004 as the Member of Parliament for Bukit Gantang earlier.

In the 2013 election, she contested the seat of Taiping, but was defeated by Nga Kor Ming of the Democratic Action Party (DAP).

Tan contested the Perak state seat of Jalong instead in the 2018 general elections but lost.

Controversy
In October 2008, Tan was rebuked by the then Prime Minister Abdullah Ahmad Badawi for having criticised the United Malays National Organisation (UMNO), the leading party in the Barisan Nasional government, for what she saw as race-based politics.

Election results

Honours
  :
  Knight Commander of the Order of the Perak State Crown (DPMP) - Dato' (2006)

References

Living people
1958 births
People from Malacca
Malaysian politicians of Chinese descent
Malaysian Buddhists
Parti Gerakan Rakyat Malaysia politicians
Members of the Dewan Rakyat
Women members of the Dewan Rakyat
Women in Perak politics
21st-century Malaysian politicians
21st-century Malaysian women politicians